Water planet may refer to:

 Issues concerning planetary habitability
 Water (Lexx), a fictional planet in the television series Lexx
 Water, a fictional planet in the animated television series Shadow Raiders
 Water Planet, 2012 Polish TV show
 Ocean world, planetary body containing a significant amount of water
 Ocean planet, a hypothetical type of planet completely covered in water

See also
 Marine World (disambiguation)
 Sea World (disambiguation)
 Ocean World (disambiguation)
 Water World (disambiguation)
 Waterland (disambiguation)